Count Józef Kajetan Ossoliński (1758–1834) was a Polish szlachcic.

Castellan of Podlaskie Voivodeship since 1790, Senator Castellan of Polish Kingdom in 1822–1824 and Starost of Sandomierz in 1781.

1758 births
1834 deaths
Counts of Poland
Jozef Kajetan